The Lameta Formation, also known as the Infratrappean Beds, is a sedimentary geological formation found in Madhya Pradesh, Gujarat, and Maharashtra, India, associated with the Deccan Traps. It is of Maastrichtian age (Late Cretaceous), and is notable for its dinosaur fossils. Many dubious names have been created for isolated bones, but several genera of dinosaurs from these rocks are well-supported, including the titanosaur sauropod Isisaurus and the abelisaurs Indosaurus, Indosuchus, Laevisuchus, and Rajasaurus. As well as mammals, snakes and other fossils.

Lithology 
The formation is underlain by the Lower Cretaceous sedimentary "Upper Gondwana Sequence" also known as the Jabalpur Formation, and is overlain by the Deccan Traps basalt. The Lameta Formation is only exposed at the surface as small isolated outcrops associated with the Satpura Fault. The lithology of the formation, depending on the outcrop, consists of alternating clay, siltstone and sandstone facies, deposited in fluvial and lacustrine conditions. The environment at the time of deposition has alternatively been considered semi-arid, or tropical humid.

Dinosaurs

Snakes

Turtles

See also 
 List of dinosaur-bearing rock formations
 Geology of India
 Deccan Traps
 Maevarano Formation, contemporaneous fossiliferous formation of Madagascar
Intertrappean Beds

References

Bibliography 
  

Geologic formations of India
Upper Cretaceous Series of Asia
Cretaceous India
Maastrichtian Stage
Shale formations
Sandstone formations
Limestone formations
Deltaic deposits
Fluvial deposits
Lagoonal deposits
Shallow marine deposits
Tidal deposits
Ooliferous formations
Paleontology in India
Geology of Maharashtra
Formations
Formations
World Heritage Tentative List for India